Leri Abuladze (born 19 January 1999) is a Georgian Greco-Roman wrestler. He is a silver medalist at the World Wrestling Championships and a gold medalist at the European Wrestling Championships.

Career 
In April 2021, Abduladze won one of the bronze medals in the 63 kg event at the 2021 European Wrestling Championships held in Warsaw, Poland. In November 2021, he won the gold medal in the 63 kg event at the 2021 U23 World Wrestling Championships held in Belgrade, Serbia.

He won the gold medal in the 63 kg event at the European Wrestling Championships held in Budapest, Hungary.

Achievements

References

External links 

 

1999 births
Living people
People from Khulo
Male sport wrestlers from Georgia (country)
European Wrestling Champions
World Wrestling Championships medalists
European Wrestling Championships medalists
21st-century people from Georgia (country)